Margaret Elizabeth Wingfield  (19 January 1912 – 6 April 2002) was a British Liberal Party politician and President of the Liberal Party from 1975 to 1976.

Background
Wingfield was educated at Freiburg University and the London School of Economics. She was a social worker and housewife. She was the niece of the Liberal Member of Parliament (MP) Charles McCurdy. Her granddaughter is Carita Ogden, who was a Liberal Democrat Councillor in the London Borough of Lambeth.

Political career
Wingfield was active internally with the Liberal Party. She served on the Liberal Party Council from 1962. She was an executive member, of the British Group of Liberal International. She was Chairman of the Liberal Party social security panel. She was President of the Liberal Party from 1975 to 1976. Her term of office coincided with the time of the revelations about party leader, Jeremy Thorpe's private life and his subsequent resignation.

Wingfield also stood as a Liberal candidate for public office. She stood as a candidate in Putney at the 1961 London County Council election. She also stood four times for parliament; for Wokingham in 1964 and 1966, at the 1967 Walthamstow West by-election and for Chippenham in 1970.

External links 
 "She kept the Liberals together after the Jeremy Thorpe affair" (obituary), The Guardian, London, 17 April 2002.

References

1912 births
2002 deaths
Alumni of the London School of Economics
University of Freiburg alumni
Liberal Party (UK) parliamentary candidates
Presidents of the Liberal Party (UK)
Commanders of the Order of the British Empire
Presidents of the National Council of Women of Great Britain